Benmore may refer to:

 Benmore, Utah, United States
 Benmore Valley AVA, United States
 Benmore Botanic Garden, Scotland
 Benmore Gardens, Gauteng, South Africa
 Benmore Dam, New Zealand
 Benmore Peak, New Zealand
 Lake Benmore, New Zealand
 Benmore or Fair Head, e headland in Northern Ireland

See also
Ben More (disambiguation)